Lugal-Zage-Si (frequently spelled Lugalzaggesi, sometimes Lugalzagesi or "Lugal-Zaggisi") of Umma (reigned c. 2358 - 2334 BCE middle chronology)  was the last Sumerian king before the conquest of Sumer by Sargon of Akkad and the rise of the Akkadian Empire, and was considered as the only king of the third dynasty of Uruk, according to the Sumerian King List. Initially, as king of Umma, he led the final victory of Umma in the generation-long conflict with the city-state Lagash for the fertile plain of Gu-Edin. Following up on this success, he then united Sumer briefly as a single kingdom.

Filiation
According to the Nippur vase of Lugalzagesi, Lugal-Zage-Si was the son of Ukush, governor of Umma:

Reign 

Lugal-Zage-Si pursued an expansionist foreign policy. He began his career as énsi of Umma, from where he conquered several of the Sumerian city-states. In the seventh year of his reign, Uruk fell under the leadership of Lugal-Zage-Si, énsi of Umma, who ultimately annexed most of the territory of Lagash under king Urukagina, and established the first reliably documented kingdom to encompass all of Sumer. The destruction of Lagash was described in a lament (possibly the earliest recorded example of what would become a prolific Sumerian literary genre), which stressed that:

 

Later, Lugal-Zage-Si invaded Kish, where he overthrew Ur-Zababa, Ur, Nippur, and Larsa; as well as Uruk, where he established his new capital. He ruled for 25 (or 34) years according to the Sumerian King List.

Lugal-Zage-Si claimed in his inscription that Enlil gave to him "all the lands between the upper and the lower seas", that is, between the Mediterranean Sea and the Persian Gulf: 

Although his incursion to the Mediterranean was, in the eyes of some modern scholars, not much more than "a successful raiding party", the inscription "marks the first time that a Sumerian prince claimed to have reached what was, for them, the western edge of the world". (Historical accounts from much later tablets asserted that Lugal-Anne-Mundu of Adab, a slightly earlier king, had also conquered as far as the Mediterranean and the Taurus mountains, but contemporary records for the entire period before Sargon are still far too sketchy to permit scholars to reconstruct actual events with great confidence.)

Lugal-Zage-Si himself was in turn defeated and his kingdom was annexed by Sargon of Akkad. According to later Babylonian versions of Sargon's inscriptions, Sargon of Akkad captured Lugal-Zage-Si after destroying the walls of Uruk, and led him in a neck-stock to Enlil's temple in Nippur:

Nippur vase of Lugalzagesi
The Nippur vase contains an extensive dedicatory inscription by Lugalzagesi, which has been reconstructed from the fragments of the vase:

Other inscriptions and sculptures

See also

History of Sumer

References

External links
Sargon's Victory Stele commemorates his victory over Lugalzagesi.
Lugalzagesi: the history of his reign.
Known inscriptions of Lugalzagesi

24th-century BC Sumerian kings
Kings  of Uruk
Kings of Umma